One Planet One Future  is a US public charity, based in New York and Milan, Italy. The Foundation was established in 2016 by artist and film director Anne de Carbuccia.  The aim is to draw attention to human-caused threats to the planet, to the environmental crisis and the dangers of the Anthropocene through art, culture and scientific information.

Origins and development 

Anne de Carbuccia began conceptualizing One Planet One Future on a filming expedition to Antarctica in 2013.

The concept first came to life through a series of photos where she had the idea of creating the TimeShrines, installations staged in symbolically significant environments incorporating organic elements and found objects, each carefully chosen for its symbolic meaning. The TimeShrines are symbols pointing to the transient nature of human existence and the resilience of the earth.

She created her first time shrine installation at Lake Powell, and since then she has travelled all over the world producing more than one hundred images for her artistic project One Planet One Future

In 2016 the project evolved with a Public Foundation in the USA and in 2018 an Association in Italy. 

The Foundation harnesses the universal language of art to raise awareness and inspire
individual and collective actions, to finally shift our perspectives.

Educational Project 

The Foundation launched an educational project in 2016. Founded on the conviction that, education is fundamental to address the environmental crisis and the rights of the future Generation; and that they need to start now to play a key role in devising solutions to protect and save our planet. The learning experience interests students from kindergarten through college.  
The project is free of charge.

Now that educational resources are more important than ever, we are expanding our digital content with our Lessons for the Planet. Through Anne's images, the lessons recount the key themes of the Anthropocene: Water, Drought, Climate Refugees, War, Trash, Endangered Species and Cultures, as well as the infinite possibilities of a positive Anthropocene: Wonder, Hope, Protection, Action, Love. Through her stories, they also address certain educational themes that are becoming increasingly relevant for the school of the future: urban responsibility and the importance of choice, the connections and interconnections between events and between us and the Planet. Lessons in English and Italian. For extra materials and webinars: https://oneplanetonefuture.org/education

Exhibitions 
Latest exhibitions:
 Florence, Brun Fine Art - Palazzo Larderel - One Planet One Future - Jun 11 to Jun 30, 2019
London, Brun Fine Art - One Planet One Future - Sep 28 to Nov 15, 2018
Naples, Castel dell'Ovo - One Planet One Future – Jun 23 to Sept 30, 2018 
Moscow, Museum of Modern Art – One Planet One Future – Jun 21 to Sept 10, 2017
 Milano, Ventura Lambrate – One Planet One Future – Mar 30 to Apr 12, 2017
 New York, Westbeth Art Foundation – One Planet One Future – Sep 16 to Nov 21, 2016
 Monaco, Museum of Oceanography – Water at Dusk – Jan 30 to Feb 29, 2016
Permanent Art Centers:
 Milan, Via Conte Rosso 8, 20134 Milan, Italy- Opening in September 2017

References

External links 
 
 One Planet One Future - New York Art Center Google Map /One+Planet+One+Future+ny/data=!4m5!4m4!1m0!1m2!1m1!1s0x89c259ea54cd1f2f:0x73cfe42d813ddb37?sa=X&ved=0ahUKEwj1lOGvyszUAhUqKMAKHZDhCHwQ9RcIiQEwDw
 One Planet One Future - Milan Art Center Google Map /one+planet+one+future+milano/data=!4m5!4m4!1m0!1m2!1m1!1s0x4786c65a0eb684b5:0xa4fb0318f1b046c4?sa=X&ved=0ahUKEwiguNDoyszUAhVqDMAKHcBwAysQ9RcIkgEwEA

Installation art works